The Elements of Java Style is a book of rules of programming style in the Java computer language. The book was published by Cambridge University Press in January 2000. The book provides conventions for formatting, naming, documentation, programming and packaging.

This book is part of a series of books that include The Elements of C# Style and The Elements of C++ Style.

This book is used as a style guide by computer science courses and in business.

Notes

External links
 Cambridge University Press

Computer programming books
2000 non-fiction books
Cambridge University Press books